Nerman may refer to:
Nerman, Iran, a village in Fars Province
Nerman Fatić (born 1994), Bosnian tennis player
Birger Nerman (1888–1971), Swedish archaeologist and writer
Einar Nerman (1888–1983), Swedish artist
Ture Nerman (1886–1969), Swedish socialist politician and activist

See also
Nerman Museum of Contemporary Art, art museum in Kansas, United States